Rakičan is a village in the Municipality of Murska Sobota in the Prekmurje region of Slovenia.

There is a Baroque mansion known as Rakičan Castle west of the main settlement. It stands in a large park and was originally a 17th-century castle with defences that was remodelled in the 18th century.

References

External links 

Rakičan on Geopedia

Populated places in the City Municipality of Murska Sobota